Potiphar's wife is a figure in the Hebrew Bible and the Quran. She was the wife of Potiphar, the captain of Pharaoh's guard in the time of Jacob and his twelve sons. According to the Book of Genesis, she falsely accused Joseph of attempted rape after he rejected her sexual advances, resulting in his imprisonment.

In Genesis she is given no name, but in later medieval Jewish sources and Islamic tradition, she is identified as Zuleikha ( zoo-LAY-kah;).  The story of Yusuf and Zulaikha is a popular one in Islamic literature.

In Genesis 

The Bible (Genesis 39:5-20) narrates her treatment of Joseph, slave to her husband Potiphar:

In Quran 

The Quran narrates the wife of Aziz’s treatment of Yusuf as follows:

Interpretation

In Jewish sources 

Jewish commentators also see some good motives in her actions.  A story about Zuleikha is told in Sefer haYashar, where she was mocked by other aristocratic Egyptian ladies, her circle of friends, for being infatuated with a Hebrew slave boy. Inviting her friends to her home, Zuleikha gave them all oranges and knives to slice them with. While they engaged in this task, Zuleikha had Joseph walk through the room. Distracted by his handsomeness, all the ladies accidentally cut themselves with the knives, drawing blood. Zuleikha then reminded her friends that she had to see Joseph every day. Following this incident, her contemporaries no longer mocked her.

Rashi comments that the wife of Potiphar saw through astrology that she would have children through Joseph. The astrological calculations however were slightly off. Asenath, her daughter (by adoption, in some accounts) became the wife of Joseph and therefore the wife of Potiphar begot grandchildren (not children) through Joseph.

In Islamic sources 

Muslim scriptural commentators (Mufassirun) have regarded Zuleikha as a sinner and villainess with the exceptions of the great Muslim mystic poets Rumi, Hafiz and Jami. For Rumi, Zuleikha's obsession with Joseph is a symptom and manifestation of the soul's great deep longing for God. For this, he insists, it is true of any person's deep love for another.

Scholarly criticism 
Scholars such as Meir Sternberg (1985) characterise the woman's repetitive behaviour towards Joseph as sexual assault. McKinlay (1995) noted that Potiphar's wife is treated as an object in his master's possession (Gen 39:8–9), and the reason Joseph refuses is not because he doesn't want to have sex with her, but because it would violate his master's trust and be a sin against the God Yahweh. It could be argued that the woman is trying to assert herself as a person who makes her own choices instead of remaining an object owned by her husband, and invites Joseph to join her in this action which the narrative frames as a 'sin'. Simultaneously, however, she abuses her position of power as the slave master's wife to coerce Joseph into sex, and to punish him for refusal. Susan Tower Hollis (1989) demonstrated that the narrative of Potiphar's wife 'is in line with certain ancient folk-tales, where a 'woman makes vain overtures to a man and then accuses him of attempting to force her', with the man 'unjustly punished for his alleged attempt to seduce the woman.'

See also 
Names for the Biblical nameless
Joseph and Aseneth
Sudabeh (re. attempted seduction and false accusation of Siyâvash)

References

Ancient Egyptian women
Book of Genesis people
Joseph (Genesis)
Women in the Hebrew Bible
Unnamed people of the Bible
False allegations of sex crimes
Sexuality in the Bible
Sexual harassment
People of the Quran